5-Nitro-2-propoxyaniline, also known as P-4000 and Ultrasüss, is about 4,000 times the intensity of sucrose (hence its alternate name, P-4000).  It is an orange solid that is only slightly soluble in water.  It is stable in boiling water and dilute acids. 5-Nitro-2-propoxyaniline was once used as an artificial sweetener but has been banned in the United States because of its possible toxicity.

In the US, food containing any added or detectable level of 5-nitro-2-propoxyaniline is deemed to be adulterated in violation of the act based upon an order published in the Federal Register of January 19, 1950 (15 FR 321).

References

External links

Aromatic amines
Food additives
Sugar substitutes
Nitro compounds
Ethers